The buccal artery (buccinator artery) is a small artery in the head. It branches off the second part of the maxillary artery and supplies the cheek and buccinator muscle.

Course
It runs obliquely forward, between the pterygoideus internus and the insertion of the temporalis, to the outer surface of the buccinator, to which it is distributed, anastomosing with branches of the facial artery and with the infraorbital. From the infraorbital area, it descends bilaterally in the superficial face along the lateral margin of the nose, then running anti-parallel to the facial artery across the lateral oral region.

Additional images

References

External links 
 

Arteries of the head and neck